This article details the Warrington Wolves Rugby League Football Club's 2011 season. This is the clubs sixteenth season of the Super League era. The club will also look to defend the Challenge Cup following victory at Wembley Stadium against Leeds Rhinos in August 2010.

Pre-season

Warrington Wolves played 3 pre-season fixtures before the new Super League season kicks off. The Wolves faced Widnes Vikings, Leigh Centurions and Wigan Warriors.
The Wolves ran out comfortable winners at Widnes winning by 48-18 and also at Leigh by 58-10. 
Wolves new signings Brett Hodgson and Joel Monaghan both made their debuts for the club in the victory at Leigh Centurions.

The fixture against Wigan Warriors is for Jon Clarke's Testimonial after he has now been at the club for 10 consecutive seasons. Warrington Wolves fell to a 16-22 defeat to end the pre-season campaign.

2011 Table

2011 Engage Super League Fixtures and Results

2011 Engage Super League XVI Play-offs Fixtures and Results

2011 Carnegie Challenge Cup Fixtures and Results

2011 Squad
As of 1 January 2011:

2011 Transfers In/Out

In

Out

References

Warrington Wolves seasons
Warrington Wolves